Tomasz Sołtyk (1732 – 24 April 1808) was a Polish nobleman.

Tomasz was castellan of Zawichost, later of Wiślica. As a senator he participated in the Great Sejm.

Tomasz Sołtyk was married to Helena Żeleńska.

References
Sołtyk Tomasz. In: Polski Słownik Biograficzny.

1732 births
1808 deaths
18th-century Polish nobility
Tomasz